Sporohalobacter are a genus of anaerobic bacteria belonging to the family Haloanaerobiaceae. The organisms are spore-forming bacteria that grow in hypersaline environments.

See also
 List of bacterial orders
 List of bacteria genera

References 

Halanaerobiales
Bacteria genera
Taxa described in 1988